The Methodist Church in Singapore (MCS) is the church that Methodists in Singapore belong to. The Church has 46 churches island-wide with around 42,000 members, and is the largest mainline Protestant denomination in Singapore. Its current bishop and head of the Church is Rev Dr Gordon Wong, who was elected at the 12th Session of the General Conference on 7 September 2020.

The Church also has 15 schools, 13 kindergartens and five childcare centres under its umbrella.

History
The Methodist Church in Singapore started out as a missionary initiative by Rev James Thoburn of the South India Conference in India in 1885 . Rev William Fitzjames Oldham travelled to Singapore to plant the foundations of the mission. Oldham started the church's first English-language boys' school in 1886, the Anglo-Chinese School. Two girls' schools (Methodist Girls' School and Fairfield Methodist Girls' School) were subsequently established in 1887 and 1888, respectively. The mission also developed a clinic and hostels for homeless children.

From this Singapore base, the mission then spread to the Malay Peninsula and Sarawak in the 1890s. The Methodist Mission in Singapore and Malaya expanded over time, eventually growing to the administrative status of a conference in the Methodist Church. Eventually, the church spread throughout Southeast Asia, leading to the establishment of the Southeast Asian Central Conference in 1950.

The Malaysian and Singapore components of the mission officially became autonomous of their Western parent bodies in 1968; thus, becoming an Asian church with a bishop elected from the local ministers. In 1976, the church was restructured into The Methodist Church in Singapore and The Methodist Church in Malaysia to reflect the secession of Singapore from Malaysia.

Organisation
The Methodist Church in Singapore, which consists of 46 local congregations, is organised in conferences: general conference, annual conferences, district and local conferences.

The General Conference, which meets every four years, is the highest decision-making body of the MCS, led by the elected Bishop and an equal number of elected representatives (both clergy and laity) from each of the three Annual Conferences. For day-to-day matters between sessions of the General Conference, the powers of the General Conference are to be found in the General Conference Executive Council (GCEC).

The General Conference is the only body that speaks officially for the church.  No person, no paper, no organisation has the authority to speak officially for The Methodist Church, this right having been reserved exclusively to the General Conference under the Constitution.

The Women's Society of Christian Service (WSCS) was set up to help Methodist women grow in the knowledge and experience of God as revealed in Jesus Christ, challenge them to respond to God's redemptive fellowship, to make Christ known throughout the world and to develop a personal responsibility for the whole task of the Church.  Its ministries include Spiritual Life, Social Concerns, Christian Education and Missions.

The Methodist Missions Society (MMS) was established in 1991 as the missions agency of The Methodist Church in Singapore.  MMS seeks to establish indigenous churches supported by mission endeavours in communities across the region where there is no Methodist presence.  The current focus is on the Asian region, particularly Cambodia, China, Nepal, Thailand and Vietnam, owing to their proximity to Singapore and the multiple opportunities to reach the large numbers of unreached people groups in these countries for religious conversion.

The Methodist Welfare Services (MWS) is the outreach and social-concerns arm of The Methodist Church in Singapore. It provides care, support and practical help to Singaporeans facing life's crises and long-term hardship regardless of their race, religion or language.  Under the current umbrella of MWS or associated with it, there are 13 service hubs including three Family Service Centres, three Children & Youth Centres, the Christalite Methodist Home for the destitute and the Bethany Methodist Nursing Home.

The Methodist Church in Singapore is a member of the National Council of Churches of Singapore.

List of bishops
This is a list of Bishops of the Methodist Church in Singapore, in order of their election to the episcopacy, both living and dead.

Elected by General Conference, U.S.A. to superintend Methodist work in Southern and Southeast Asia
 James M Thoburn (1888 - 1904)
 Frank W Warne [assisting James M Thoburn] (1900 - 1904)
 William F Oldham (1904 - 1912)
 John E Robinson (1912 - 1914)
 William P Eveland (1914 - 1916)
 [No Resident Bishop - Episcopal duties covered by Bishops John E Robinson and JW Robinson] (1916 - 1920)
 George H Bickley (1920 - 1924)
 Titus Lowe (1924 - 1928)
 Edwin F Lee (1928 - 1948)
 [No Resident Bishop - Episcopal duties covered by Bishops Ralph Cushman and Arthur J Moore] (1948 - 1950)

Elected by Southeastern Asia Central Conference
 Raymond L Archer (1950 - 1956)
 Hobart B Amstutz (1956 - 1964)
 Robert F Lundy (1964 - 1968)

Elected by The Methodist Church in Malaysia and Singapore
 Yap Kim Hao (1968 - 1973)
 Theodore R Doraisamy (1973 - 1976)

Elected by The Methodist Church in Singapore
 Kao Jih Chung (1976 - 1984)
 Ho Chee Sin (1984 - 1996)
 Wong Kiam Thau (1996 - 2000)
 Robert M Solomon (2000 - 2012)
 Wee Boon Hup (2012 - 2016)
 Chong Chin Chung (2016 - 2020)
 Gordon Wong Cheong Weng (2020-)

Annual conferences
The Methodist Church in Singapore is organised into three branches called "Annual Conferences" as each of them meets once a year. These are the Chinese Annual Conference comprising churches with largely Chinese-speaking congregations, Emmanuel Tamil Annual Conference for churches with largely Tamil-speaking congregations and Trinity Annual Conference for churches with largely English-speaking congregations. However, many churches now conduct services in languages other than the language appropriate to the annual conference that they belong to.

The three Annual Conferences are headed by the Bishop. Each of the three Annual Conferences is headed by a President.

List of Methodist churches in Singapore

Chinese Annual Conference
Ang Mo Kio Methodist Church
Bukit Panjang Methodist Church
Changi Methodist Church
Charis Methodist Church
Foochow Methodist Church
Geylang Chinese Methodist Church
Grace Methodist Church
Hakka Methodist Church
HingHwa Methodist Church
Holy Covenant Methodist Church
Kum Yan Methodist Church
Kum Yan Methodist Church (Woodlands)
Paya Lebar Chinese Methodist Church
Paya Lebar Methodist Mission

Queenstown Chinese Methodist Church
Sengkang Methodist Church
Telok Ayer Chinese Methodist Church
Toa Payoh Chinese Methodist Church
Yishun Methodist Mission

Emmanuel Tamil Annual Conference
Ang Mo Kio Tamil Methodist Church
Jurong Tamil Methodist Church 
Pasir Panjang Tamil Methodist Church
Seletar Tamil Methodist Church 
Bedok Preaching Point 
Sembawang Tamil Methodist Church 
Singapore Telugu Methodist Church 
Tamil Methodist Church 
Toa Payoh Tamil Methodist Church

Trinity Annual Conference

Agape Methodist Church
Aldersgate Methodist Church
Ang Mo Kio Methodist Church
Barker Road Methodist Church
Bukit Batok Preaching Point
Bedok Methodist Church
Cairnhill Methodist Church
Christ Methodist Church
Christalite Methodist Chapel
Covenant Community Methodist Church
Fairfield Methodist Church
Fairfield Preaching Point
Faith Methodist Church
Holland Village Methodist Church
Kampong Kapor Methodist Church
Living Hope Methodist Church
Living Waters Methodist Church
The Methodist Church of the Incarnation
Paya Lebar Methodist Church
Pentecost Methodist Church
Toa Payoh Methodist Church
Trinity Methodist Church
Wesley Methodist Church

Schools
There are 16 schools managed by the Methodist Church, which is represented by the Methodist Schools Foundation.

Six of the schools are part of the Anglo-Chinese School family which includes a junior college.

The other schools are:
 Methodist Girls' School
 Paya Lebar Methodist Girls' School (Primary)
 Paya Lebar Methodist Girls' School (Secondary)
 Fairfield Methodist School (Primary)
 Fairfield Methodist School (Secondary)
 Geylang Methodist School (Primary)
 Geylang Methodist School (Secondary)

Schools under the ACS family:
 Anglo-Chinese School (Primary)
 Anglo-Chinese School (Junior)
 Anglo-Chinese School (Barker Road)
 Anglo-Chinese School (Independent)
 Anglo-Chinese School (International)
 Anglo-Chinese Junior College
 ACS Jakarta, Jakarta, Indonesia

Other Methodist Schools:
 St. Francis Methodist School
 Methodist School of Music

See also

Methodism
Christianity in Singapore
Religion in Singapore

Notes

Further reading
.
.

External links
Official website of the Methodist Church in Singapore

Methodism in Singapore
Religious organisations based in Singapore
Christian organizations established in 1968
Methodist denominations established in the 20th century